The U-23 Baseball World Cup is a biennial, professional-level, National Team, baseball world championship of the World Baseball Softball Confederation (WBSC), replacing Baseball World Cup.

The inaugural tournament was held in November 2014, in Taichung, Taiwan, as the 21U Baseball World Cup, with each team made of 21-year-old and younger players but allowed for six players to be 23-year-old and younger. Starting with the 2016 edition—in Monterrey, Mexico—the tournament has been expanded to permit nations to select players up to 23 years old for their entire rosters. Players must also possess valid passports of the nations they are representing, in line with Olympic standards. The U-23 Baseball World Cup is the third-most-important international baseball tournament in terms of distribution of world ranking points, following the Premier12 and the World Baseball Classic.

The rosters of national teams that participated in the tournament included professional players from clubs affiliated to the Australian Baseball League, Chinese Professional Baseball League, Korea Baseball Organization, Major League Baseball, Mexican Baseball League, Nicaraguan Professional Baseball League, and Nippon Professional Baseball.

Results

Notes

Medal table

Participating nations

See also

Baseball at the Summer Universiade
World University Baseball Championship

References

External links
U-23 Baseball World Cup Official Website 
IBAF introduces new Format of International Tournaments.  IBAF official website
Hosting rights of 2016 Baseball World Cups awarded to Japan, Mexico, South Korea.  IBAF official website

 
under
Youth baseball competitions
Biennial sporting events
Recurring sporting events established in 2014
Baseball
World youth sports competitions
World Baseball Softball Confederation competitions